David "Eli" MacEachern (born November 4, 1967) was a two-sport athlete from Canada. He was a Canadian bobsledder who competed in the 1990s. Competing in three Winter Olympics, he and Pierre Lueders won the gold medal in the two-man event (shared with Italy) at Nagano in 1998. He was also a soccer player that competed at the university level as well as national competitions. He was born in Charlottetown, Prince Edward Island.

MacEachern also won a silver medal in the two-man event at the 1996 FIBT World Championships in Calgary.

In 2004, David MacEachern was inducted into the PEI Sports Hall of Fame.

References

External links
 
 
 

1967 births
Bobsledders at the 1992 Winter Olympics
Bobsledders at the 1994 Winter Olympics
Bobsledders at the 1998 Winter Olympics
Canadian male bobsledders
Living people
Medalists at the 1998 Winter Olympics
Olympic bobsledders of Canada
Olympic gold medalists for Canada
Olympic medalists in bobsleigh
Sportspeople from Charlottetown